Jung Myung-hoon, known as By.Fantasy or Fantasy, is a South Korean League of Legends head coach for SANDBOX Challengers of the LCK Challengers League. Formerly a StarCraft and StarCraft2 player, he is one of 3 Terrans to be under the wing of Choi "iloveoov" Yeon-sung.

StarCraft playing career
Jung is known as a Terran innovator in professional StarCraft, taking one gold and three silver medals in the OnGameNet Starleague. Jung is also known for his 3–0 performance in the biggest competition in professional Korean StarCraft, the 2008–2009 Shinhan Bank Proleague Finals, in which he defeated his Zerg rival Lee Jae-dong twice to carry his team, SK Telecom T1, to the championship. Since then his performances in Proleague and individual leagues have proved him one of the best Terran players in the game. In the final OnGameNet Starleague for Starcraft: Brood War, the 2012 Tving OSL, Fantasy took 2nd place losing to JangBi in the finals. Jung retired from professional StarCraft competition in 2019.

League of Legends coaching career
He joined SANDBOX Gaming as a League of Legends coach in November 2019. In November 2020, Jung moved to Sandbox Gaming's academy team, SANDBOX Challengers, as their head coach.

Tournament results
 2nd —  2012 Tving OnGameNet Starleague
 2nd —  2011 Jin Air OnGameNet Starleague
 1st  — 2010 Bacchus OnGameNet Starleague
 2nd —  2009 Batoo OnGameNet Starleague
 2nd  — 2008 Incruit OnGameNet Starleague
 3–0 win record in 2008-09 Proleague Final

See also
 StarCraft professional competition

References

Living people
South Korean esports players
StarCraft players
T1 (esports) players
League of Legends coaches
Year of birth missing (living people)